The Heart Goes Last is a novel by Margaret Atwood, published in September 2015 by McClelland & Stewart in Canada, Nan A. Talese in the USA and Bloomsbury in the UK. The novel is described as a "wickedly funny and deeply disturbing novel about a near future in which the lawful are locked up and the lawless roam free."

The novel is set in the same near-future dystopia as the darkly comic Byliner serial Positron which was released online.

Plot 
Living in their car, surviving on tips, Charmaine and Stan are in a desperate state. So, when they see an advertisement for Consilience, a ‘social experiment’ offering stable jobs and a home of their own, they sign up immediately. All they have to do in return for suburban paradise is give up their freedom every second month – swapping their home for a prison cell. At first, all is well. But then, unknown to each other, Stan and Charmaine develop passionate obsessions with their ‘Alternates,’ the couple that occupies their house when they are in prison. Soon the pressures of conformity, mistrust, guilt and sexual desire begin to take over.

Reception 
The novel won the Red Tentacle award. Its French translation, C'est le coeur qui lâche en dernier, was selected for the 2018 edition of Le Combat des livres, where it was defended by Russell Smith.

References

Novels by Margaret Atwood
2015 Canadian novels
Canadian science fiction novels
Dystopian novels
McClelland & Stewart books